Scorpiurus, the scorpion's-tails, is a genus of flowering plants in the legume family, Fabaceae. It belongs to the subfamily Faboideae.  It contains only two species: Scorpiurus muricatus, which is used in gardening and in salads as a garnish, and Scorpiurus vermiculatus. Both are native to the Mediterranean region and the Near East.

References 

Loteae
Fabaceae genera